Karlo Bartolec (born 20 April 1995) is a Croatian footballer who plays as a defender for Hungarian club Puskás Akadémia.

Club career
On 15 March 2014, Bartolec made his professional debut against Rijeka in which he came as a 27th-minute substitute.

Bartolec was signed by Copenhagen on July 1, 2019 for 2.7M €.

On 23 January 2023, Bartolec signed a year-and-a-half-long contract with Puskás Akadémia in Hungary.

International career
He made his debut for Croatia national  football team on 15 October 2018 in a friendly against Jordan, as a starter. His final international was a November 2019 friendly against Georgia.

Career statistics

Club

References

External links

HNL-Statistika profile

1995 births
Living people
Footballers from Zagreb
Association football fullbacks
Croatian footballers
Croatia youth international footballers
Croatia under-21 international footballers
Croatia international footballers
NK Lokomotiva Zagreb players
FC Nordsjælland players
F.C. Copenhagen players
NK Osijek players
Puskás Akadémia FC players
Croatian Football League players
Danish Superliga players
Nemzeti Bajnokság I players
Croatian expatriate footballers
Expatriate men's footballers in Denmark
Croatian expatriate sportspeople in Denmark
Expatriate footballers in Hungary
Croatian expatriate sportspeople in Hungary